Pterophorus is a genus of moths in the family Pterophoridae.

Species
The genus includes the following species:

 Pterophorus africanus Ustjuzhanin & Kovtunovich, 2010
 Pterophorus albidus (Zeller, 1852)
 Pterophorus aliubasignum Gielis, 2000
 Pterophorus ashanti Arenberger, 1995
 Pterophorus bacteriopa 
 Pterophorus baliolus 
 Pterophorus candidalis 
 Pterophorus ceraunia 
 Pterophorus chosokeialis 
 Pterophorus cleronoma 
 Pterophorus dallastai 
 Pterophorus denticulata 
 Pterophorus ebbei 
 Pterophorus elaeopus 
 Pterophorus erratus 
 Pterophorus flavus 
 Pterophorus furcatalis 
 Pterophorus innotatalis 
 Pterophorus ischnodactyla 
 Pterophorus kuningus 
 Pterophorus lacteipennis 
 Pterophorus lamottei 
 Pterophorus lampra 
 Pterophorus legrandi 
 Pterophorus leucadactylus 
 Pterophorus lieftincki 
 Pterophorus lindneri 
 Pterophorus massai 
 Pterophorus melanopoda 
 Pterophorus monospilalis 
 Pterophorus nigropunctatus 
 Pterophorus niveodactyla 
 Pterophorus niveus 
 Pterophorus pentadactyla  (Linnaeus, 1758)
 Pterophorus rhyparias 
 Pterophorus spissa 
 Pterophorus tinsuki 
 Pterophorus uzungwe 
 Pterophorus virgo 
 Pterophorus volgensis (Moschler, 1862), 1862
 Pterophorus wahlbergi

References

 
Pterophorini
Moth genera